The 2020 Southeastern Conference men's basketball tournament was a postseason men's basketball tournament for the Southeastern Conference at Bridgestone Arena in Nashville, Tennessee, scheduled for March 11–15, 2020. On March 12, after the tournament had begun, the SEC cancelled the remaining games due to the spread of COVID-19.

Seeds
All 14 SEC schools were slated to participate in the tournament. Teams were seeded by conference record, with a tiebreaker system used to seed teams with identical conference records. The top 10 teams received a first round bye and the top four teams received a double bye, automatically advancing them into the quarterfinals.

Schedule

*Game times in Central Time. #Rankings denote tournament seeding.

Bracket

Game summaries

First round

See also 

 2020 SEC women's basketball tournament

References

Tournament
SEC men's basketball tournament
SEC men's basketball tournament
Basketball competitions in Nashville, Tennessee
SEC Men's Basketball
SEC men's basketball tournament
College sports tournaments in Tennessee